Orpheus und Eurydike (Orpheus and Eurydice) is an opera by Ernst Krenek. The German text is based on a play by Oskar Kokoschka. Kokoschka began writing his play during his convalescence (from wounds received on the Ukrainian front in 1915) and it premiered in 1921, one year before Rilke's Sonnets to Orpheus appeared. In 1923 he let it be known that he was looking for a composer to write incidental music. Kokoschka's expressionist, psychological treatment of the Orpheus myth, marked by his passion for Alma Mahler, appealed to Krenek so he approached Kokoschka.

They quickly decided that the work should become an opera and Krenek received carte blanche to adapt the German play, condensing it by a third in the process, and setting it to an atonal score. At one point Krenek sought help from Eduard Erdmann, who gave up. In this new form it premiered as Krenek's Op. 21 in Kassel at the Staatstheater on 27 November 1926 with Ernzt Zulauf conducting.

Roles

References

Further reading
 Orpheus und Eurydike: Der antike Sagenstoff in den Opern von Darius Milhaud und Ernst Krenek, Hans Knoch (Gustav Bosse Verlag, Kassel, 1977)
Purkis, Charlotte, "Orpheus und Eurydike" in The New Grove Dictionary of Opera, ed. Stanley Sadie (London, 1992) 
Stenzel, Ernst (Ed.), Ernst Krenek, Oskar Kokoschka und die Geschichte von Orpheus und Eurydike Jürg Stenzl (Argus 2005)

External links
 Work details, Universal Edition

German-language operas
Operas by Ernst Krenek
Operas
Operas about Orpheus
1926 operas
Operas based on plays